The Green Party (HaMiflaga HaYeruka), formerly the Green Movement, is a social-environmental movement and political party in Israel. After briefly considering running independently in the 2020 Israeli legislative election, the party decided against it, realizing they had little to no chance of passing the 3.25% threshold needed to enter the Knesset. Stav Shaffir, the party's leader, urged supporters to vote for a left leaning party to help defeat Benjamin Netanyahu.

History

The Green Movement (HaTnuʿa HaYeruka) was founded in the summer 2008 by environmental activists and led by Eran Ben-Yemini and Alon Tal. It soon formed a political party, and ran a joint list with Meimad, a dovish religious party, for the 2009 elections, after Meimad had ended its alliance with the Labor Party. Meimad leader Michael Melchior headed its list, and Ben-Yemini and Tal came in second and third place; former Shinui MK Meli Polishook-Bloch was also on its list, in eleventh place. In addition to the environment, the electoral slate's platform addressed issues of education, social democracy, religious pluralism, and co-existence. The campaign downplayed religious issues, and emphasized environmental questions. The alliance failed to win any seats in the Knesset after failing to pass the election threshold, receiving the largest number of votes of any party not to do so.

It contested the 2013 elections in an alliance with Tzipi Livni's party, Hatnua. Party leader Alon Tal was given the 13th spot on the party list. However, Hatnua only won 6 mandates. Following the election, there was a new leadership elected, with Yael Cohen Paran replacing Tal as co-chair.

It ran in the 2015 elections on a joint Zionist Union list with Hatnua and the Labor Party. Tzipi Livni chose Green Movement co-chair Yael Cohen Paran for the 25th spot (reserved for Hatnuah members) on the list. Paran missed out on election, but got in following the resignation of another list member in November 2015.

Within the Knesset, the Movement's main focus is on toxic pollution in Haifa Bay and the effects on nearby neighbourhoods. Another focus is on air pollution. Paran is heading a parliamentary inquiry on renewable energy, pioneered a study on Israel becoming carbon-free, and is introducing legislation to require solar systems in high-rise buildings.

Prior to the September 2019 elections Stav Shaffir left the Israeli Labor Party after losing the leadership election to Amir Peretz. She joined the Green Movement, becoming its new leader. The party subsequently joined the Democratic Union alliance for the elections, receiving the 2nd and 8th spots on its list. Shaffir was elected to the Knesset as the alliance won four seats.

After a 2020 snap election was announced, Meretz decided to create an electoral pact with the Labor Party without the Greens.

In the build-up to the 2020 elections, the party was renamed the Green Party.

Principles
The party's principles, as laid out by its website, are:
Action for improving the lives, health, welfare, education, and prosperity of Israeli citizens.
Responsibility and concern for the welfare, happiness, and prosperity of mankind, who shall live in a healthy, sustainable, and respectful environment in the present and in the future.
Support for a pluralistic lifestyle, and respect for every human being, regardless of their religion, race, gender, or sexual orientation.
Protection of the rights of animals and the helpless.
Implementing the Green New Deal.

Election results

Leaders

References

 

Green political parties in Israel
Political parties established in 2008
2008 establishments in Israel
Political parties in Israel
Zionist political parties in Israel
Green liberalism
Centre-left parties in Asia